Bret D. Daugherty is a major general and the current (since 2012) adjutant general of Washington state. In this role, he is the commander of the entire Washington National Guard, including both the Washington Army National Guard and the Washington Air National Guard. He was previously assistant adjutant general under Timothy Lowenberg (from 2009 to 2012).

Military career
Daugherty began his military service in the Reserve Officers Training Corps (ROTC) program at Seattle University. He graduated in 1980 with a bachelor's degree in psychology and served the following nine years on active duty as an attack helicopter trainee, pilot, and platoon leader. He then transferred to the Washington Army National Guard, where he held high positions in the  66th Theater Aviation Command. Along the way, he earned a Master of Public Administration (MPA) from Seattle University in 1989, a Master of Science in Strategic Studies from the United States Army War College in 2000, and a certificate from the Command and General Staff College. From 2005 to 2008, he served as the Commander of the 205th Regiment (Leadership). From 2008 to 2009, he served as the Commander of the 66th Theater Aviation Command. He is classified as a Senior Army Aviator.

References

External links

Official Army biography

Year of birth missing (living people)
Living people
Seattle University alumni
American Senior Army Aviators
United States Army War College alumni
United States Army Command and General Staff College alumni
National Guard (United States) generals
Recipients of the Legion of Merit
Adjutants general of the National Guard of the United States